David Raúl Villalba Candía (born 13 April 1982), known as David Villalba, is a Paraguayan association football midfielder who last played for C.A.I. of the Primera B Nacional in Argentina (2010–2011).

He previously played for Olimpia Asunción (2002–2005, 2007–2008), Sportivo Luqueño (2005), Tacuary (2006–2007) and 12 de Octubre (2009) in Paraguay, for Deportes Tolima (2008) in Colombia, and for Blooming (2010) in Bolivia.

Notes

References
 
 
 

1982 births
Living people
Paraguayan footballers
Paraguay under-20 international footballers
Paraguay international footballers
Paraguayan expatriate footballers
Club Olimpia footballers
12 de Octubre Football Club players
Sportivo Luqueño players
Deportes Tolima footballers
Club Blooming players
Comisión de Actividades Infantiles footballers
Expatriate footballers in Argentina
Expatriate footballers in Bolivia
Expatriate footballers in Colombia
Association football midfielders